Chaubttakhal is one of the 70 constituencies in the Uttarakhand Legislative Assembly of Uttarakhand state of India. Chaubattakhal is also part of Garhwal Lok Sabha constituency.

Members of Legislative Assembly

Election results

2022

2017

See also
 Bironkhal (Uttarakhand Assembly constituency)
 List of constituencies of the Uttarakhand Legislative Assembly
 Pauri Garhwal district

References

External link
  

Assembly constituencies of Uttarakhand
Pauri Garhwal district